Verdoorn is a surname. Notable people with the surname include:

Dirk Verdoorn (born 1957), Dutch-born French painter
Inez Clare Verdoorn (1896–1989), South African botanist and taxonomist

See also
Verdoorn's law, economics law named after Dutch economist Petrus Johannes Verdoorn

Dutch-language surnames
Afrikaans-language surnames
Surnames of Dutch origin